Mali competed at the 1968 Summer Olympics in Mexico City, Mexico.

Results by athlete

Boxing

Light-heavyweight (81 kg)

References
Official Olympic Reports

Nations at the 1968 Summer Olympics
1968
1968 in Mali